Milford Hundred is a hundred in Kent County, Delaware, United States. Milford Hundred was formed in 1830 from Mispillion Hundred.

References

Hundreds in Kent County, Delaware